Ringsend Bridge is a bridge over the River Dodder in Dublin, Ireland. The current bridge was opened in 1812 after the previous structure was destroyed in a flood. The bridge is part of the R802 regional road and is part of Bridge Street.

History
In 1623 Richard Morgan first petitioned Dublin Corporation to build a bridge but this was declined. A bridge was built in 1650 and this lasted until 1739 when it was washed away in a flood, mentioned in the Pembroke Estate Papers.

The new bridge lasted only until 1782 when another flood destroyed the structure. A replacement bridge was begun in 1786 but was destroyed by yet another flood the following year. A fourth bridge was built in 1789 but this succumbed to a flood in December 1802 when over 3 inches of rain fell in 24 hours. The same storm also destroyed Ormonde Bridge on the nearby River Liffey. The current structure was begun in 1803 and finally completed in 1812.

External links
 http://www.askaboutireland.ie/_internal/cimg!0/mer9u5t7xhqj52tc1ew3ktvt4ew49h3 - Picture of the ruined bridge in 1787).

References

Bridges completed in 1812
Bridges in Dublin (city)
Dublin Docklands